Abdul Soumik Hossain, (born 2 February 1983) is an Indian politician. He is a member of the All India Trinamool Congress and he is currently serving as a Member of West Bengal Legislative Assembly, 63 Raninagar, Murshidabad, West Bengal since 2021. He is one of the most prominent faces of Trinamool Congress who is doing outreach program Murshidabad. Soumik has also been the Working President of Murshidabad District All India Trinamool Congress from 2017 to 2020.

Soumik Hossain has served as the State President of the Indian Youth Congress, West Bengal from 2013-2014. He was appointed  the State General Secretary  of the All India Trinamool Youth Congress in 2014.

He currently serves as a District Co-ordinator of All India Trinamool Congress since July 2020.

References 

Trinamool Congress politicians from West Bengal
Living people
People from Murshidabad district
West Bengal MLAs 2021–2026
1983 births